Klaus Filter is a German racing shell designer.

Career highlights:
1946 Started his rowing career in postwar East Germany.
1949 Became an apprentice at the Pirsch shell builders.
1950s Became a member of the East German National Rowing Team.
1960 Developed the world's first composite rowing shell.
1961 Helped founded the East German FES (Institut für Forschung und Entwicklung von Sportgeräten). This body was charged with the analysis and improvement of athletic equipment used by the East German Sports Federation.
1965 Earned his degree in naval architecture from the University of Rostock.
1972 and 1976 Won the East German National Award for Science and Technique for his work at FES.
1979 Became a founding member of FISA's Materials Commission.
1990-2000 Served as Head of the FISA's Materials Commission.
1993 Ended his duties with FISA's Materials Commission but continued his role with the Head of the Materials Commission until his retirement in 2000.
1994 to present Started to work with the Xiong family at the Flying Eagle Boat Company.
2004 Began to work with WinTech Racing of North America.
2005 Designed the first self-bailing racing shell.  Introduced into the rowing market with WinTech Racing.
2015 Honored with "Distinguished Service to Rowing" award by the International Rowing Federation.

References

Living people
German naval architects
German male rowers
Year of birth missing (living people)